Crash Team Racing (stylized as CTR: Crash Team Racing) is a 1999 kart racing video game developed by Naughty Dog and published by Sony Computer Entertainment for the PlayStation. It is the fourth installment in the Crash Bandicoot series. The game's story focuses on the efforts of Crash Bandicoot, Doctor Neo Cortex, and other ragtag team of characters in the Crash Bandicoot series, who must race against the egomaniacal Nitros Oxide to save the Earth from destruction. In the game, players can take control of one of fifteen Crash Bandicoot series characters, though only eight are available at first. During the races, offensive and speed boosting power-ups can be used to gain an advantage.

Crash Team Racing was released on September 30, 1999 in North America, and on October 20, 1999 in Europe. It was praised by critics for its gameplay and graphics, though the audio was met with mixed opinions. A successor, Crash Nitro Kart, was released in 2003 for the Game Boy Advance, GameCube, PlayStation 2, Xbox and N-Gage. A remaster of the game, titled Crash Team Racing Nitro-Fueled, was announced at The Game Awards 2018 and was released on PlayStation 4, Xbox One and Nintendo Switch on June 21, 2019.

Gameplay

Crash Team Racing is a kart racing game in which the player controls characters from the Crash Bandicoot universe, most of whom compete in karts. While racing, the player can accelerate, steer, reverse, brake, hop or use weapons and power-ups with the game controller's analog stick and buttons. Two distinct forms of crates are scattered throughout the tracks and arenas of Crash Team Racing. Crates with question marks on them hold power-ups and weapons, which can be obtained by driving through and breaking apart said crates. When the player collects a weapon or power-up, it will appear in a box at the top of the screen. The player can activate the weapon or power-up to wreak havoc on the other racers or supplement the player's own performance. "Fruit Crates" carry "Wumpa Fruit" that increase the speed of the player's kart and strengthen the player's weapons and power-ups if ten of them are obtained.

A crucial maneuver in Crash Team Racing is the power slide; the player executes the slide by holding down one of the shoulder buttons to perform a hop, and steering before the kart lands. While sliding, the "Turbo Boost Meter" on the lower-right corner of the screen fills up and goes from green to red. At the same time, the exhaust gas from the player's kart turns black. To get a speed boost, the player quickly presses the opposite shoulder button while the Turbo Boost Meter is red. The player can execute three speed boosts in a row during a power slide, with the third speed boost being more powerful than the previous two. If the player waits too long into the power slide for a boost, the kart back-fires and the chance for a speed boost is lost; power sliding for too long causes a spin-out. Aside from power slides, speed boosts can be obtained by gathering hang time when leaping over gaps in the track. The longer the player is in the air, the bigger the speed boost will be when the kart lands.

Modes
Crash Team Racing features 5 racing modes: Adventure, Time Trial, Arcade, Versus and Battle. In each mode, the player selects 1 from 8 characters to control. A PlayStation multitap can be installed to allow three or four-player games. The "Adventure Mode" is a one-player game where the player must race through all of the tracks and arenas in the game and collect as many trophies, Relics, Boss Keys, CTR Tokens and Gems as possible. The objective of the Adventure Mode is to save the world from the story's antagonist, Nitros Oxide, by winning races on 16 different tracks. In the beginning of the game, the player only has access to two levels. As the player wins more races, more tracks on multiple worlds become available. In each level, the player must win a trophy by coming in first place. When the player receives all four trophies in a world, the "Boss Garage" of that world can be accessed. In the Boss Garage, the player competes in a one-on-one race against a boss character. If the boss character is defeated, the character will relinquish a Boss Key, which the player uses to access new worlds and ultimately to face Oxide inside his spaceship.

After beating levels, new modes become available, such as the Relic Race, in which the player races through the track alone and completes three laps in the fastest time possible. "Time Crates" scattered throughout the level freeze the game timer when a player drives through them. If all of the Time Crates are destroyed, the player's final time is reduced by ten seconds. The player wins a Relic by beating the time indicated on the screen. Another mode, the CTR Challenge, is played like a normal race, except that the player must also collect the letters C, T and R scattered throughout the track. If the player manages to collect all three letters and come in first place, a "CTR Token" is awarded. These tokens come in five different colors: Red, Green, Blue, Yellow and Purple. The Purple CTR tokens are awarded for beating the Crystal Bonus Round by collecting 20 crystals under a certain time limit. If the player collects four tokens of the same color, the player will be able to access the Gem Cup of the corresponding color. Gem Cups are racing tournaments held against computer-controlled opponents and are accessible in a secret area in the "Gemstone Valley" world. A Gem Cup consists of four tracks in a row, in which the player must race for points. If one of these cups is won, a Gem is awarded. To win the game, the player must collect all trophies, Boss Keys, Relics, CTR Tokens and Gems before defeating Nitros Oxide in a one-on-one race.

The "Time Trial" mode is a single-player mode where the player attempts to set the best time on any of the tracks in the game. There are no other racers to hinder the player and no power-ups. When the Time Trial is finished, the player has the option to save a "ghost", a replay of that race; the next time that track is accessed in this mode, the player can race against the ghost. In the "Arcade" mode, the player can quickly scroll through and race on a selection of tracks. The player can choose to select a Single Race or enter a Cup, in which the player races on four tracks in a row for points. In the Single Race and the Cup Race, one or two players race with the remaining computer-controlled drivers. The difficulty of the race and number of laps can be customized. The "Versus" mode is similar to that of the Arcade mode, with the exception that two or more human players must be involved.

In the "Battle" mode, up to four players can fight customized battles, launching weapons during combat in one of seven special battle arenas. The type and length (the latter modifies how many hit points or minutes the battle will have) of the battle can be adjusted beforehand, allowing for three types of battles. In a "Point Limit Mode" battle, the first player to achieve 5, 10 or 15 points wins. In the "Time Limit Mode" battle, the player with the highest points after 3, 6 or 9 minutes wins. In the "Life Limit Mode", each player has a set number of lives (3, 6 or 9) and the battle has a time limit (3, 6 minutes or forever). The player with the most lives at the end of the time limit wins. If "forever" is chosen as the length, the battle lasts until only one player is standing. Three and four players can team up for 2-vs.-1, 2-vs.-2, 3-vs.-1 or 1-vs.-1-vs.-2 battles.

Plot

Characters

Fifteen characters are playable in Crash Team Racing, although only eight of them are playable from the start. Crash Bandicoot, the main protagonist of the series, is an all-round racer with balanced acceleration, top speed and handling. Doctor Neo Cortex, Crash's archenemy, is a mad scientist who wants to stop Nitros Oxide so that he may conquer the world himself. Like Crash, his kart is an all-round performer. Coco Bandicoot, Crash's younger sister, is a computer genius who installed computer chips into her kart to increase its acceleration prowess. Doctor N. Gin is a rocket scientist who, like Coco, added custom parts to his kart to improve its acceleration. Pura and Polar pilot karts with low speed but improved handling, allowing them to navigate tight corners. Tiny Tiger and Dingodile control karts built for top speed at the cost of turning prowess.

The main antagonist of the story, Nitros Oxide, is the self-proclaimed fastest racer in the galaxy who threatens to turn Earth into a concrete parking lot and make its inhabitants his slaves. Oxide appears only as an opponent in the game's final race and time trials, and cannot be controlled by the player. Preceding Oxide are four boss characters: Ripper Roo, a deranged straitjacket-wearing kangaroo; Papu Papu, the corpulent leader of the island's native tribe; Komodo Joe, a Komodo dragon with a speech sound disorder; and Pinstripe Potoroo, a greedy pinstripe-clad potoroo. The four boss characters, along with an imperfect and morally ambiguous clone of Crash Bandicoot named Fake Crash, become accessible as playable characters if the Adventure Mode is fully completed. Doctor Nefarious Tropy appears as the player's opponent during the Time Trial races and an unlockable playable character, while a bonus character, Penta Penguin, can only be unlocked via cheat code.

Appearing as the player's tutors in the game are the sentient twin witch-doctor masks Aku Aku and Uka Uka, both of whom give hints that help the player develop their racing skills. They double as obtainable "Invincibility Mask" power-ups during the races, temporarily protecting the player from all attacks and obstacles while increasing the kart's speed. However, their power does not protect the player from chasms or deep water.

Story
The inhabitants of Earth are visited by an extraterrestrial named Nitros Oxide, who claims to be the fastest racer in the galaxy. Challenging Earth to a game called "Survival of the Fastest", he beckons Earth's best driver to race him. If Earth's driver wins, he promises to leave Earth alone, but if Oxide wins, he will turn Earth into a concrete parking lot and enslave the Earthlings. In response, the player character gathers all four Boss Keys needed to access Oxide's spaceship and races him in a one-on-one match. Upon Oxide's defeat at the hands of the player character, he temporarily leaves Earth, but promises that he will return when all of the Time Relics have been gathered. Oxide faces the player again after all the Time Relics are gathered. After losing once more, Oxide keeps his word and angrily leaves Earth forever. An epilogue is relayed during the end credits, explaining what the characters of the game did after the events of the story. Nitros Oxide himself returns to his home planet of Gasmoxia and secludes himself from society. After undergoing years of therapy to cope with his loss, he takes up unicycle-racing, only to get into a gruesome accident.

Development

Development of Crash Team Racing started with block-headed characters with no Crash or otherwise related personalities. Naughty Dog showed their development to Sony, and showed interest in having the game be Crash-themed, to which Sony agreed, and made a deal with Universal. The game could have had original characters in case the deal did not come through. Naughty Dog began production on Crash Team Racing after the completion of Crash Bandicoot 2: Cortex Strikes Back; the game engine for Crash Team Racing was created at the same time Crash Bandicoot: Warped was produced. Development took place over the course of eight months on a budget of $2.4 million by a team of 16–18 staff. The characters of the game were designed by Charles Zembillas and Joe Pearson, who designed the characters of the last three installments of the series. Nitros Oxide was originally a mad scientist obsessed with speed who plotted to speed up the entire world until the end of time. However, having exhausted human, animal, machine, and various combinations for Crash Bandicoot bosses in the past, it was decided to have Nitros Oxide be an otherworldly character. The original "speed up the world" plot is referenced in a promotional comic (written by Glenn Herdling and drawn by Neal Sternecky) featured in the Winter 2000 issue of Disney Adventures.

During the game's prototypical stage, the team built a replica of the "Crescent Island" course from Diddy Kong Racing to test whether a racetrack of the same scope and scale was possible on the PlayStation. To address the complication of potentially having up to 64 kart tires on a four-player split-screen, programmer Greg Omi developed a method of rendering the tires as camera-based two-dimensional sprites. The turbo system that gives the player boosts of speed during power slides and by gathering hang time was added to make Crash Team Racing feel more interactive and involving than older kart-racing games. The central antagonist character Oxide was never intended to be playable in the game due to the PlayStation console's memory limitations. Said limitations further affected the game's roster of playable characters; Polar and Pura were originally to ride in the same kart and be played as a single character, but were ultimately split into separate characters, and both Komodo Brothers were to appear in the game before Komodo Moe was omitted.

David Baggett produced the game's soundtrack, with Josh Mancell of Mutato Muzika composing the music. Sound effects were created by Mike Gollum (who also provided some voice-acting), Ron Horwitz and Kevin Spears of Universal Sound Studios. The voice of Crash was provided by Chip Chinery, while Clancy Brown voiced Doctor Neo Cortex and Uka Uka, and Brendan O'Brien voiced Doctor N. Gin, Tiny Tiger and Pinstripe Potoroo. Additional voices were provided by David A. Pizzuto, Mel Winkler, Michael Ensign, Hynden Walch, Billy Pope and Michael Connor. Crash Team Racing went into the alpha stage of development in August 1999, and the beta stage on September. NASCAR vehicle No. 98 was given a custom Crash Bandicoot-themed paint job in promotion of the game. A playable demonstration was included on a promotional compilation disc released by Pizza Hut on November 14, 1999.

Reception

Crash Team Racing received "generally favorable" reviews, according to review aggregator Metacritic. Official U.S. PlayStation Magazine described Crash Team Racing as "the game that made kart racing cool" and proclaimed that "nothing has ever matched its quality." Electronic Gaming Monthly noted that the game was "heavily inspired by Mario Kart, but still an amazing multiplayer racer." Doug Perry of IGN stated that the game was "rock solid" in playability and graphics, but was critical of "the insanely capitalistic smile of Crash." Jeff Gerstmann of GameSpot called the game "a great Mario Kart clone", and opined that it succeeded where similar games like Mega Man Battle & Chase, Bomberman Fantasy Race, Diddy Kong Racing, Chocobo Racing and Mario Kart 64 had failed. Johnny Liu of GameRevolution concluded that despite the fact that the game "doesn't add much to the tired genre, it manages to do everything well."

The game's controls were well received. The D-Pad Destroyer of GamePro praised the controls as "nearly-perfect" and explained that "the transparent controls allow you to concentrate on racing and blasting your opponents, and so the races are faster, more fluid and more fun." Johnny Liu of GameRevolution concluded that the controls "feel very natural, with an emphasis on maintaining speed rather than fighting lousy controls." However, Joe Ottoson of All Game Guide said that the inability to reconfigure the controls was "the only real drawback to Crash's presentation."

The graphics of the game were positively received. The D-Pad Destroyer of GamePro, while noting that the graphics were not too complex, cited the "cartoony look and the ingenious use of textures and colors" as high points in the graphics department. Doug Perry of IGN commended the "sharp looking" environments as "clean and fully formed" and the characters are "full of funny animations and cleanly designed". Jeff Gerstmann of GameSpot said that the environments "are reasonably large, and they convey the cartoon-like attitude of the game very nicely." GameRevolution Johnny Liu stated that the graphics were "smooth and seem to push the PlayStation's limits."

Critics expressed mixed opinions of the game's audio. The D-Pad Destroyer of GamePro said that the "whimsical" background music is "quite enjoyable" and the character sound bites are "varied enough to avoid becoming annoying." IGN's Doug Perry had a more mixed take, saying that the "classic bouncy, xylophone-heavy beat" is "not necessarily great", and that after a few courses, "you either stop hearing it, or the incessant simplicity of it makes you want to cry or pull your hair out". On the subject of the voice acting, he concluded that there is "nothing really that cute, clever or memorable" in the game, and noted that Crash's voice in the game is extremely similar to that of Luigi from the Mario Kart series. Jeff Gerstmann of GameSpot wrote that while the music and sound effects "push the game's cartoon theme," the themes were not too "over the top" or incessant. Johnny Liu of GameRevolution passed the music off as "standard kitschy fare" and added that while the sound effects "add to the cartoon quality of the game", some of the character voices were unsatisfactory. Joe Ottoson of Allgame noted that the characters "are all quite vocal", and the music "sets off the whimsical mood nicely".

Crash Team Racing has sold 1.9 million units in the United States and over 300,000 units in Japan. As a result of its success, the game was re-released for the Sony Greatest Hits line-up in 2000 and for the Platinum Range on January 12, 2001. An indirect sequel titled Crash Nitro Kart was released in 2003 for the PlayStation 2, Xbox, GameCube, Game Boy Advance and N-Gage and was the first game in the Crash Bandicoot series to feature full motion video.

Notes

Bibliography

External links
 

1999 video games
Crash Bandicoot racing games
Kart racing video games
Multiplayer and single-player video games
Naughty Dog games
PlayStation (console) games
PlayStation Network games
Racing video games
Sony Interactive Entertainment games
Universal Interactive games
Vehicular combat games
Video games scored by Josh Mancell
Video games set on fictional islands
Video games featuring female protagonists
Video games developed in the United States